Rainer Kempe (born 24 July 1989) is a German professional poker player from Berlin, Germany.

Poker career
Kempe began playing live poker tournaments in 2011. Kempe made small profits from 2011 to 2014.

In 2015, Kempe finished 5th at the European Poker Tour €5,000 No Limit Hold'em Main Event, winning €320,400. In December 2015, he won the EPT12 Prague €25,500 Single Day High Roller, winnings €539,000.

In January 2019, Kempe won the $50,000 PokerStars Caribbean Adventure Single-Day High Roller, winning $908,100. During the same tournament series Kempe won the $10,200 No Limit Hold'em - KO Turbo (Event #41), taking down $117,280. Later in the month, Kempe won the Aussie Millions AU$25,000 challenge earning AU$831,465.

As of 2021, Kempe's live tournament winnings exceed $21,000,000. He is the third most successful German poker player behind Fedor Holz and Christoph Vogelsang.

Gaming 
Along with fellow poker players Stefan Schillhabel, Steffen Sontheimer, Fedor Holz, Manig Loeser, Rainer Kempe is part of the "No Limit Gaming group", which mixes poker players and video games players. They have a counterstrike and a league of legends team.

Personal life
He attended the Rosa-Luxemburg-Gymnasium in Pankow and later studied at the University of Potsdam and the University of Sussex in Falmer, England. Kempe lives in Brighton.

References

External links
 Rainer Kempe Hendon Mob profile

German poker players
Living people
1989 births